Capital expenditure or capital expense (capex or CAPEX) is the money an organization or corporate entity spends to buy, maintain, or improve its fixed assets, such as buildings, vehicles, equipment, or land. It is considered a capital expenditure when the asset is newly purchased or when money is used towards extending the useful life of an existing asset, such as repairing the roof.

Capital expenditures contrast with operating expenses (opex), which are ongoing expenses that are inherent to the operation of the asset. Opex includes items like electricity or cleaning. The difference between opex and capex may not be immediately obvious for some expenses; for instance, repaving the parking lot may be thought of inherent to the operation of a shopping mall. The dividing line for items like these is that the expense is considered capex if the financial benefit of the expenditure extends beyond the current fiscal year.

Usage
Capital expenditures are the funds used to acquire or upgrade a company's fixed assets, such as expenditures towards property, plant, or equipment (PP&E).  In the case when a capital expenditure constitutes a major financial decision for a company, the expenditure must be formalized at an annual shareholders meeting or a special meeting of the Board of Directors.  In accounting, a capital expenditure is added to an asset account, thus increasing the asset's basis (the cost or value of an asset  adjusted for tax purposes). Capex is commonly found on the cash flow statement under "Investment in Plant, Property, and Equipment" or something similar in the Investing subsection.

Accounting rules
For tax purposes, capex is a cost that cannot be deducted in the year in which it is paid or incurred and must be capitalized. The general rule is that if the acquired property's useful life is longer than the taxable year, then the cost must be capitalized. The capital expenditure costs are then amortized or depreciated over the life of the asset in question. Further to the above, capex creates or adds basis to the asset or property, which once adjusted, will determine tax liability in the event of sale or transfer. In the US, Internal Revenue Code §§263 and 263A deal extensively with capitalization requirements and exceptions.

Included in capital expenditures are amounts spent on:
 acquiring fixed, and in some cases, intangible assets
 repairing an existing asset so as to improve its useful life
 upgrading an existing asset if it results in a superior fixture
 preparing an asset to be used in business
 restoring property or adapting it to a new or different use
 starting or acquiring a new business

An ongoing question for the accounting of any company is whether certain costs incurred should be capitalized or expensed. Costs which are expensed in a particular month simply appear on the financial statement as a cost incurred that month. Costs that are capitalized, however, are amortized or depreciated over multiple years. Capitalized expenditures show up on the balance sheet. Most ordinary business costs are either expensable or capitalizable, but some costs could be treated either way, according to the preference of the company. Capitalized interest if applicable is also spread out over the life of the asset. Sometimes an organization needs to apply for a line of credit to build another asset, it can capitalize the related interest cost. Accounting Rules spreads out a couple of stipulations for capitalizing interest cost. Organizations can possibly capitalize the interest given that they are building the asset themselves; they can't capitalize interest on an advance to buy the asset or pay another person to develop it. Organizations can just perceive interest cost as they acquire costs to develop the asset.

The counterpart of capital expenditure is operating expense or operational cost (opex).

See also
Operating expense (operational expenditure, opex)
Total cost of ownership (TCO)
Contract management software
Capital cost
Cash flow statement
Income statement
Balance sheet
Expenses versus capital expenditures

References 

Financial capital
Accounting terminology
Capital budgeting
Fixed asset